Leishenshan Hospital was an emergency specialty field hospital built in response to the COVID-19 pandemic. The facility is located at No.3 Parking Lot of the Athletes Village in Jiangxia District, Wuhan, Hubei. Stage one of construction was completed on 6 February 2020, and the hospital opened on 8 February 2020. Along with the Huoshenshan Hospital, a further sixteen other temporary treatment facilities were set up for isolation and treatment of COVID-19 cases. Leishenshan and Huoshenshan hospitals were closed on 15 April 2020.

Etymology
The name "Leishen" refers to Leigong, a deity in Chinese folk religion who punishes both earthly mortals guilty of secret crimes and evil spirits who have used their knowledge of Taoism to harm human beings.

The name "Lei" is also related to the concept of wood in wuxing, wherein wood begets fire and fire overcomes metal. In traditional Chinese medicine, the metal element governs the lung, so the name conveys the hope that the respiratory infection caused by SARS-CoV-2 will eventually be eliminated.

History
At 3:30 p.m. on 25 January 2020, the Wuhan municipal government decided to establish an additional hospital named "Leishenshan Hospital" in response to the COVID-19 pandemic. The hospital was located at No.3 Parking Lot of the Athletes Village in Jiangxia District of Wuhan. On January 27, the National Development and Reform Commission announced the allocation of 300 million yuan to subsidize the construction of Huoshenshan Hospital and Leishenshan Hospital. The same day, the State Grid Corporation of China announced to donate 60.28 million yuan worth of physical materials to the construction of the two hospitals.

On 6 February 2020, the construction of the hospital was completed. 2 days later on 8 February 2020, a total of 1,600 beds were delivered to the hospital. On the same day, Vice Premier Sun Chunlan visited the building. She stressed that treatment should be carried out based on the priority of the severity of the patient's condition. The first patients were admitted to the hospital on the same day.

As of 20 February 2020, the hospital had an operational capacity of 1500 beds.

On 15 April 2020, it was 'retired' after treating 2,011 patients. It currently remains on standby.

Design
The hospital is a field hospital-based building with modular design. It has 32 zones for patients, two of which are for those in critical condition and three for those with serious symptoms.

See also
 Dabie Mountain Regional Medical Centre
 Huoshenshan Hospital
 Fangcang hospital

References

External links
 

COVID-19 pandemic in mainland China
2020 establishments in China
Hospital buildings completed in 2020
Hospitals established for the COVID-19 pandemic
Hospitals established in 2020
Hospitals in Wuhan